Mount Garfield may refer to:

Mount Garfield (Colorado), in Mesa County
Mount Garfield (San Juan County, Colorado)
Mount Garfield (New Hampshire)

See also
Garfield Mountain (disambiguation)
Garfield Peak (disambiguation)